Gordon Earl Appleby (June 4, 1923 – January 28, 2011) was an American football center. A native of Massillon, Ohio, he played for the Ohio State Buckeyes. He was named the Buckeyes team MVP in 1943, and was a fourth-team selection by the United Press for its 1944 College Football All-America Team. He helped the Buckeyes to an undefeated season in 1944.

Appleby was drafted 26th overall by the New York Giants in the 1945 NFL Draft but never played in the National Football League.

References

1923 births
2011 deaths
American football centers
Ohio State Buckeyes football players
Sportspeople from Massillon, Ohio